Venice of America House is a Late Victorian house built in 1906 in present-day Venice in Los Angeles, California.

The Venice of America House was listed on the National Register of Historic Places in 2001.

See also
 Venice, Los Angeles
 List of Registered Historic Places in Los Angeles
 List of Los Angeles Historic-Cultural Monuments on the Westside

References

Victorian architecture in California
Houses on the National Register of Historic Places in Los Angeles
Houses completed in 1906
Venice, Los Angeles
1906 establishments in California